The Association of Professional Flight Attendants (APFA) was founded in 1977 and represents over 28,000 flight attendants at American Airlines. In 2003, APFA played a major role in keeping American Airlines solvent and out of bankruptcy by giving back an employee bailout of $340 million in annual salary and benefits, for a total of over $3 billion. APFA had been in negotiations with American for almost four years when the carrier filed for chapter 11-bankruptcy protection on November 29, 2011.

1993 strike
More than 90 percent of the 21,000 members honored the 11-day strike called on November 18, virtually shutting the airline down.
On November 22 President Bill Clinton intervened in the labor dispute and persuaded both sides to submit to binding arbitration ending the 11-day strike on its 5th day.

American Airlines Bankruptcy

In April 2003 American Airlines, following total losses of $5.3 billion in 2001 and 2002, undergoes what was called a “virtual bankruptcy.” Management uses the threat of bankruptcy to achieve concessions from unionized employees in the amount of $1.8 billion annually. Despite the new cost structure, American lost money through 2011.

After years of losses, plunging stock prices, contract negotiations, and failed business strategies, in November 2011, American Airlines files for Chapter 11 protection in the US Bankruptcy Court for the Southern District of New York. Arpey resigns as CEO and is replaced by longtime American executive Tom Horton. In a statement, Horton says he intends to use bankruptcy to “reduce our labor costs to competitive levels.”

Shortly after the filing, in December, the US Trustee appoints the Unsecured Creditors Committee (UCC). All three of the unions on the property are awarded a seat, as are the Pension Benefit Guaranty Corporation (PBGC), Boeing Capital, Hewlett-Packard, and three major bond-holders. The UCC represents the interest of parties who are owed money by the bankrupt company and who do not have any collateral standing behind their claim. The committee becomes the de facto Board of Directors throughout the restructuring. Although the APA and TWU send representatives to the UCC, Laura Glading, president of APFA, chooses to sit on the committee herself.

In January 2012 the PBGC, the federal agency that backstops retirees’ benefits when a company pension plan fails, sends a public signal in support of American’s unions when its director, Josh Gotbaum, states that his agency is prepared to fight to prevent American from using bankruptcy to shed its pension plans.

In February 2012 American released its Term Sheets detailing the concessions it will seek from labor under Section 1113 of the Bankruptcy Code. Section 1113 allows for bankrupt companies to void their labor contracts and impose new concessionary agreements with only the approval of the Judge necessary. Typically, the threat of imposed draconian contracts motivates unions to achieve mutual agreements on concessionary contracts. The term sheet American executives offers APFA include dramatic cuts to wages, benefits, and work rules, and the loss of hundreds of flight attendant jobs.

In March 2012, facing pressure from APFA, Allied Pilots Association (APA), Transport Workers Union of America (TGWU), the PBGC and others, American backed off its original demand to terminate pensions and instead offers to freeze them. The pension freeze allows employees to keep full benefits accrued before the time of the freeze.

In April 2012 APFA, APA, and TWU announced that they had reached agreements with the management team of US Airways and that the three major unions at American support a merger between the two carriers with the US Airways team in control.  APFA’s bridge agreement with US Airways provides a temporary contract while the two carriers merge followed by a guaranteed network-rate contract. Additionally, the agreement includes a Voluntary Early-Out Program that allows flight attendants to take a lump sum payment and retire. Like the demands from American, the deal with US Airways is concessionary. However, US Airways’ plan for the merged airline allows the company to grow and compete, offering long-term job stability.

In August, faced with the prospect of living under American’s draconian term sheet, APFA approves management’s Last, Best, and Final Offer (LBFO). Although the LBFO represents substantial improvements to the term sheet, including the VEOP, it is still a very concessionary agreement. APFA, APA, and TWU remain committed to achieving a merger with US Airways inside of bankruptcy. As part of this strategy, TWU also ratifies a concessionary deal. APA rejects its first tentative agreement (TA) but a “Me Too” letter, secured by APFA, guarantees that the labor savings from the Pilots Agreement are equivalent to the savings achieved in the flight attendants’ collective bargaining agreement (CBA).

In September US Airways and American begin to exchange confidential information regarding operations and finances. This cooperation is subject to a Non-Disclosure Agreement (NDA) between the two parties which includes a mandatory “quiet period” during which no party can speak publicly about the merger talks. Also bound by this agreement are the members of the UCC, including APFA.

In November 2012 APA negotiated a second TA and sends it out for a membership vote. On December 7, the Pilots ratified the TA. APFA Negotiating Team is reviewing the new agreement in order to quantify any improvements the pilots may have achieved. The “Me, Too” Letter secured in August mandates that the value of the changes to the Pilots’ Agreement and flight attendants’ Agreement are equivalent.

In February 2013 AA and US Airways announce their plans to merge.

References

External links 

Representational History of the APFA
A Strike at American Airlines Disrupts Travel of Thousands
American Airlines Says Strike Cost $160 Million In Profits
 

Transportation trade unions in the United States
Flight attendants' trade unions
Euless, Texas
Trade unions established in 1977
1977 establishments in the United States